Julien Harrison Hill (September 15, 1877 – December 1, 1943) was an American football coach.  He was the tenth head football coach at the University of Richmond in Richmond, Virginia, serving for one season, in 1899, and compiling  a record of 2–2. He later was a banker who served as president of the National Association of State Chambers of Commerce.

Head coaching record

References

External links
 

1877 births
1943 deaths
American bankers
Richmond Spiders football coaches
University of Virginia alumni
Sportspeople from Richmond, Virginia